Lester Quitzau (born September 21, 1964) is a Canadian folk and blues guitarist from Edmonton, Alberta.

In addition to his own albums, he also collaborates with the roots trio Tri-Continental with Bill Bourne and Madagascar Slim, and tours and records with his wife, folk-pop singer Mae Moore.

Discography

 Keep on Walking (1994)
 A Big Love (1996)
 Tri-Continental (2000)
 So Here We Are (2001)
 Live (2002, with Tri-Continental)
 Let's Play (2003, with Tri-Continental)
 Oh My! (2004, with Mae Moore)
 Drifting (2004, with Tri-Continental)
 The Same Light (2009)
 Dust Dance (2018, with Tri-Continental)

References

External links
 Lester Quitzau
 
 

1964 births
Living people
Canadian blues guitarists
Canadian male guitarists
Canadian folk guitarists
Canadian people of Danish descent
Canadian people of Dutch descent